Tigrioides is a genus of moths in the family Erebidae. The genus was erected by Arthur Gardiner Butler in 1877.

Species
 Tigrioides alterna (Walker, 1854)
 Tigrioides antipulvereola Holloway, 2001
 Tigrioides aurantiaca Hampson, 1918
 Tigrioides chionostola Hampson, 1918
 Tigrioides dimidiata Matsumura, 1927
 Tigrioides euchana (Swinhoe, 1893)
 Tigrioides euscia Hampson, 1914
 Tigrioides fulveola (Hampson, 1900)
 Tigrioides grisescens Bethune-Baker, 1908
 Tigrioides inversa Gaede, 1925
 Tigrioides kobashayii Inoue, 1961
 Tigrioides leucanioides (Walker, 1862)
 Tigrioides luzonensis Schaus, 1922
 Tigrioides minima (Hampson, 1903)
 Tigrioides nitens (Walker, [1865])
 Tigrioides pallidicosta Schaus, 1922
 Tigrioides phaeola (Hampson, 1900)
 Tigrioides puncticollis (Butler, 1877)
 Tigrioides pyralina (Rothschild, 1912)
 Tigrioides sabulosalis (Walker, [1866])
 Tigrioides schraderi Gaede, 1925
 Tigrioides soror Schaus, 1922

Former species
 Tigrioides aureolata Daniel, 1954
 Tigrioides bicolor Grote, 1864
 Tigrioides immaculata (Butler, 1880)
 Tigrioides laniata Hampson, 1914
 Tigrioides limayca Daniel, 1954
 Tigrioides pallens Inoue, 1980
 Tigrioides pulverulenta Lucas, 1890
 Tigrioides suffusus Talbot, 1926

References

Lithosiina
Moth genera